Ryan Henderlin is a Sri Lankan singer/songwriter. He was the winner of the reality TV English singing competition YES Superstar Season 3 in 2015, organized by YES FM and MTV. He is currently singing professionally in the English and Sinhala industry of Sri Lanka, singing for an a cappella choir group "Vocal Enigma" and his band "VOID".

YES Superstar Season 3 
Henderlin's audition was aired on the 2nd episode of the show on 11 May 2015, impressing the judges by singing Percy Sledge's - "When a man loves a woman" and moved on. Round 2 used backing tracks and continued with the live band "Rebels" from round 3 onward until the finale.

On 30 August 2015, Henderlin was announced winner of Season 3 of YES Superstar, with Vithma Kumarage becoming the 1st runner-up, Darren Stork being 2nd runner-up and Dinukshi Hettige being 3rd runner-up.

References 

Sri Lankan singer-songwriters
Year of birth missing (living people)
Living people